Licht is the seventh studio album by the German Heavy metal band Die Apokalyptischen Reiter, released by Nuclear Blast Records on 29 August 2008. It peaked at #29 in the German Media Control Charts. The U.S. version - 2009 of Licht comes with six bonus tracks (2 studio, 4 live) and different album art.

Track listing 

Lyrics by Fuchs. Music by Die Apokalyptischen Reiter.
  "Es Wird Schlimmer" – 4:07
  "Auf Die Liebe" – 3:09
  "Wir Sind Das Licht" – 3:03
  "Nach Der Ebbe" – 3:33 
  "Adrenalin" – 3:42 	
  "Der Elende" – 5:32 
  "Heut´ Ist Der Tag" – 2:46 	
  "Wir Hoffen" – 3:54 	
  "Der Weg" – 3:30 	
  "Ein Lichtlein" – 4:25 	
  "Auferstehen Soll In Herrlichkeit" – 4:36

North American track listing 

  "Es Wird Schlimmer" – 4:12
  "Auf Die Liebe" – 3:14
  "Wir Sind Das Licht" – 3:07
  "Nach Der Ebbe" – 3:38
  "Adrenalin" – 3:47
  "Der Elende" – 5:36
  "Heut´ Ist Der Tag" – 2:50
  "Wir Hoffen" – 3:58
  "Der Weg" – 3:35
  "Ein Lichtlein" – 4:29
  "Auferstehen Soll In Herrlichkeit" – 4:41
(Bonus tracks)
  "Ich Suche" - 4:20
  "Adrenalin" (Monstermix) - 2:56
  "Wir Sind Das Licht (Live) - 3:30
  "Es Wird Schlimmer (Live) - 4:35
  "Der Weg (Live) - 3:56
  "Nach Der Ebbe (Live) - 3:36

Personnel 

Fuchs: Guitars, Vocals
Lady Cat-Man: Guitars
Dr. Pest: Keyboards
Volk-Man: Bass
Sir G.: Drums, Percussion

References 

Die Apokalyptischen Reiter albums
2008 albums